Kantharawichai is a district (amphoe) in the northern part of Maha Sarakham province, northeastern Thailand.

Geography
Neighboring districts are (from the south clockwise): Mueang Maha Sarakham, Kosum Phisai, and Chiang Yuen of Maha Sarakham Province; Yang Talat and Khong Chai of Kalasin province.

History
The district dates back to the Mueang Kanthang (กันทาง), which was founded in 1785 under the name Khanthathirat (คันธาธิราช). In 1874 it was renamed Mueang Kantharawichai.

The mueang was converted to a district in 1900. In 1913 it was transferred from Kalasin to Maha Sarakham Province, and in 1915 the district office in Ban Khok Phra was opened. In 1917 the district was renamed Khok Phra accordingly, but the historic name was restored in 1939.

Administration
The district is divided into 10 sub-districts (tambons), which are further subdivided into 183 villages (mubans). Khok Phra is a township (thesaban tambon) which covers parts of tambon Khok Phra. There are a further 10 tambon administrative organizations (TAO).

References

External links
amphoe.com

Kantharawichai